Priscilla Ann Presley ( Wagner, changed by adoption to Beaulieu; born May 24, 1945) is an American actress and businesswoman. She is the former wife of American singer Elvis Presley, as well as co-founder and former chairwoman of Elvis Presley Enterprises (EPE), the company that turned Graceland into one of the top tourist attractions in the United States. In her acting career, Presley co-starred with Leslie Nielsen in the three Naked Gun films and played the role of Jenna Wade on the long-running television series Dallas.

Early life

Priscilla Ann Wagner was born at Brooklyn Naval Hospital in Brooklyn on May 24, 1945. Her maternal grandfather, Albert Henry Iversen (1899–1971), was born in Egersund, Norway. He immigrated to the United States, where he married Lorraine Davis (1903–1984), who was of Scots-Irish and English descent. Their only daughter was Anna Lillian Iversen (1926–2021), who later was called, or her name was changed to, Ann. She gave birth to Priscilla when she was 19 years old.
 
Priscilla's biological father was US Navy pilot James Frederick Wagner (1921–1945), son of Kathryn (1901–1995) and Harold Wagner (1897–1958) of Cherrytree Township, Pennsylvania. At age 23 he married Priscilla's mother, Ann, on August 10, 1944. They had been dating for more than three years. Wagner died in a plane crash returning home on leave when Priscilla was six months old.
 
In 1948, Ann married a United States Air Force officer named Paul Beaulieu (1925–2018), from Quebec, Canada. The couple raised Priscilla along with half-siblings Donald (b. 1949), Michelle (b. 1954), Jeffrey (b. 1959) and twins Thomas (1962–2013) and Timothy Beaulieu (b. 1962). Priscilla took on the Beaulieu surname. Over the next few years, the growing family repeatedly relocated as her stepfather's Air Force career moved them from Connecticut to New Mexico to Maine. Priscilla describes herself during this period as "a shy, pretty, little girl, unhappily accustomed to moving from base to base every two or three years." Priscilla later recalled how uneasy she felt having to move so often, never knowing if she could ever make friends for life, or if she would fit in with the people she would meet at the next place.
 
In 1956, the Beaulieus settled in Del Valle, Texas, but soon her stepfather was transferred to Wiesbaden, West Germany. Priscilla was "crushed" by this news, as just after junior high, her fear of having to leave friends behind and make new ones was once again realized.

Life in West Germany
When the Beaulieus arrived in West Germany, they stayed at the Helene Hotel, but, after three months, living there became too expensive, and they looked for a place to rent. The family settled into a large apartment in a "vintage building constructed long before World War I." Soon after moving in, the Beaulieus realized it was a brothel, but, given the scarcity of housing, they had little choice but to remain.

Life with Elvis

Germany
On September 13, 1959, during Elvis Presley's Army service, he met Priscilla at a party at his rented home in Bad Nauheim, Germany. Though only 14 years old, she made an impression on him.  Elvis allegedly regressed to acting like an "awkward, embarrassed" boy-next-door figure in front of her. By the end of the evening, however, he managed to compose himself. Priscilla’s parents were upset by her late return home the night of that first meeting and insisted that she never see Elvis again, but his eagerness for another rendezvous and his promise never to bring her home late again led them to relent. Thereafter, he and Priscilla were frequently together until his departure from West Germany in March 1960. After Elvis left, Priscilla was inundated with requests for interviews from media outlets around the world. She received fan mail from Elvis fans, some positive and some negative, as well as mail from "lonesome G.I.s". With gossip-magazine rumors swirling about his relationship with Nancy Sinatra, Priscilla became convinced that her romance with Elvis was over and she would never see him again.

Move to Graceland

After Elvis's return to the US, she managed to stay in touch with him by phone, though they did not see each other again until the summer of 1962, when Priscilla's parents agreed to let her visit for two weeks. They allowed her to go on the condition Elvis pay for a first-class round trip and arrange for her to be chaperoned at all times, and that she write home every day. Elvis agreed to all these demands, and Priscilla flew to Los Angeles. Elvis told her they were going to Las Vegas, and, to throw her parents off the scent, he had Priscilla write a postcard for every day they would be away – to be mailed from Los Angeles by a member of his staff.

It was during this visit, while on a trip to Las Vegas, that Priscilla first took amphetamines and sleeping pills to keep up with Elvis' lifestyle. After another visit at Christmas, Priscilla's parents let her move to Memphis for good in mid-March 1963. Part of the agreement was that they would eventually marry. She would finish her senior year at an all-girls Catholic school, the Immaculate Conception High School, and live with Elvis' father and stepmother in a separate house a few streets away from the Graceland mansion at 3650 Hermitage Drive, until she graduated in June. However, according to her 1985 autobiography, Elvis and Me, she "spent entire nights with Grandma [Elvis' grandmother, Minnie Mae Presley] at Graceland and gradually moved her belongings there." It is believed she had her permanent residence at Graceland as early as May 1963. Her parents eventually agreed to her living there if Elvis promised to marry her. Priscilla later said, "The move was natural. ... I was there all the time anyway."

Priscilla was keen to go to Hollywood with Elvis, but he kept telling her he was too busy and had her stay in Memphis. During the filming of Viva Las Vegas, Elvis began an affair with his co-star Ann-Margret. When Priscilla read of these reports in the press, she confronted Elvis. He told her they were simply rumors to promote the film and that she should not believe everything she read in the press. For the next few years, Elvis had intimate relationships with many of his leading ladies and co-stars, all the while denying their existence to Priscilla. Eventually she was allowed to visit him in Hollywood, but her visits were kept short.

Marriage and pregnancy

Shortly before Christmas 1966, Elvis proposed to Priscilla. Colonel Parker, Elvis's manager, encouraged him to marry by reminding him about his RCA "morals clause" within his record contract. Priscilla suggested in a 1973 interview with Ladies' Home Journal that she and Elvis were quite happy to just live together, but "at that time it wasn't nice for people to [just] live together". Accounts by Elvis's cook, Alberta, claim that he was so upset about the wedding that she caught him crying about it one day. When she asked why he did not just cancel the wedding if it upset him so much, he replied "I don't have a choice."  Marty Lacker, a close friend to Elvis, has also spoken about Elvis's reluctance to marry, while others such as Joe Esposito have asserted that Elvis was excited to marry Priscilla.

In her book, Elvis and Me, Priscilla describes Presley as a very passionate man who was not overtly sexual towards her. According to her account, the singer told her that they had to wait until they were married before having intercourse. He said, "I'm not saying we can't do other things. It's just the actual encounter. I want to save it." Priscilla says in her autobiography that she was a virgin and she and Elvis did not have sex until their wedding night. However, this claim is questioned by biographer Suzanne Finstad.

The couple married on May 1, 1967, at the Aladdin Hotel in Las Vegas. The wedding, arranged by Parker to maximize publicity, featured very few guests and was over in only eight minutes. It was followed by a quick press conference and a $10,000 breakfast reception, attended by friends, family, and business associates from MGM, RCA, and the William Morris Agency. The wedding caused rifts between Elvis and several of his closest friends who were not invited to the actual wedding ceremony. Red West, especially, was furious about the situation. He and his wife had been personally invited by Elvis to Las Vegas for the wedding, had dressed for the occasion, and at the last minute were told that they would not be present. For Red, who had been with Elvis since the beginning of his rise to fame and had given Elvis the role of best man at his own wedding, this was enough of an insult that he decided to quit his job working for Elvis. Many other friends of Elvis were also disappointed and held resentment towards him for many years to follow, although they mainly blamed Parker for their exclusion rather than Elvis himself.

Following the reception, Elvis and Priscilla boarded a private jet and enjoyed a short honeymoon in Palm Springs. On May 4, they flew back to Memphis and retreated to their private ranch, just over the Mississippi state line, for a three-week break. Many of Elvis' inner circle joined them, although for the most part the couple were left alone and were able to enjoy each other's company without the intrusion of the Memphis Mafia. "I loved playing house," she later remarked; adding, "Here was an opportunity to take care of him myself. No maids or housekeepers to pamper us."  In an attempt to heal rifts, Elvis and Priscilla held another reception at Graceland on May 29 for the friends and family who were unable to attend the original ceremonies.

Soon after, Priscilla found out that she was pregnant. She was upset at such an early pregnancy, certain that it would destroy the closeness she had finally found with Elvis. She had asked him earlier if she could take birth control pills, but Elvis had insisted they were not perfected yet. She considered abortion, and even discussed it with Elvis at one point, but both decided they could not live with themselves if they had gone through with it. Their only child, Lisa Marie, was born exactly nine months after their wedding, on February 1, 1968.

Priscilla wrote in Elvis and Me that, around the time Elvis was filming Live a Little, Love a Little (1968), she began taking private dance lessons. She found herself deeply attracted to the instructor, known simply as Mark in the book, and she confesses to having a short affair. She implies regret, however, saying, "I came out of it realizing I needed much more out of my relationship with Elvis."

Despite Priscilla's affair and Elvis's on-and-off relationships with his co-stars and leading ladies, the first few years they were married seemed a happy time for the couple. However, when Elvis's career took off again after his 1968 television special, he was constantly touring and playing in Las Vegas. Elvis had also been seeing other women on and off, often leaving Priscilla at home with Lisa Marie. Because Elvis was away so often, the marriage soured.

Separation and divorce
Elvis was a keen karate student and persuaded Priscilla to take it up. Priscilla thought it was a good idea, as it would pass the time she spent alone if she had a hobby on which to concentrate, and she was also keen to share in Elvis' interests. Following disruptions from Elvis, Priscilla began taking lessons from Mike Stone, a karate instructor she had met in 1972 backstage at one of Elvis' concerts. She soon began an affair with him. Priscilla states in her book, "My relationship with Mike had now developed into an affair. I still loved Elvis greatly, but over the next few months I knew I would have to make a crucial decision regarding my destiny." She later states, "Elvis must have perceived my new restlessness." A couple of months later, she said that Elvis had requested to see her in his hotel suite. It was then that she writes in her book that Elvis "forcefully made love to me...[as he said] 'This is how a real man makes love to his woman.'"

She later stated in an interview that she regretted her choice of words in describing the incident, and said it had been an overstatement. She went on to say following the incident, "what really hurt was that he was not sensitive to me as a woman and his attempt at reconciliation had come too late," suggesting that his actions were a deliberate attempt at reconciliation or compensation for his lack of sexual interest in Priscilla which had been a source of hurt and discontent for her for years. Priscilla states in her book, "He had mentioned to me before we were married that he had never been able to make love to a woman who had a child" and she later expressed the personal repercussions of their sexual dysfunction, saying, "I am beginning to doubt my own sexuality as a woman. My physical and emotional needs were unfulfilled." After this incident, Priscilla summarized, "this was not the gentle, understanding man I grew to love."

Elvis and Priscilla separated on February 24, 1972, and filed for legal separation on July 26. To avoid Priscilla having to make her home address available on the public records and therefore risking the security of both her and Lisa Marie, Elvis filed for divorce on his 38th birthday, January 8, 1973. Later that month, Elvis reportedly became paranoid about Mike Stone and said, "There's too much pain in me... Stone [must] die." His outbursts continued with such intensity that a physician was unable to calm him, even with large doses of medication. After another two days of raging, Elvis' friend and bodyguard, Red West, made inquiries to arrange a contract killing of Stone, but was relieved when Elvis said, "Aw hell, let's just leave it for now. Maybe it's a bit heavy." The divorce was finalized on October 9, 1973.

The couple agreed to share custody of their daughter and Priscilla was awarded an outright cash payment of $725,000 as well as spousal support, child support, 5% of Elvis' new publishing companies and half the income from the sale of their Beverly Hills home. Originally the couple had agreed upon a much smaller settlement; a $100,000 lump payment, $1,000 a month spousal support, and $500 a month child support. Priscilla was keen to make it on her own and prove that her marriage to Elvis was not about money. Soon afterwards, however, her new lawyers persuaded her to increase her demands, pointing out that a star of Elvis' stature could easily afford more for his former wife and child.

Priscilla and Elvis remained close, leaving the courthouse on the day of their divorce hand in hand.

Business 

In 1973, after her split from Elvis, Presley set up a clothing boutique in Los Angeles called Bis & Beau with her friend and stylist Olivia Bis. Elvis was supportive of Priscilla's venture, and he even contacted several friends in public relations to help with promotion for the launch. In a 1973 interview to promote the opening of the store, Priscilla said, "After the separation, I had to make up my mind about what I wanted to do, and since I had worked with Olivia for such a long time on my own clothes, I decided to try it professionally. We both do the designing for the shop, and have people who sew for us." The shop was a successful venture, with celebrity clients including Diana Ross, Carol Burnett, Jill Ireland, Mary Tyler Moore, Victoria Principal, Michelle Phillips, Dyan Cannon, Julie Christie, Suzanne Pleshette, Cher, Liza Minnelli, Lana Turner, Barbra Streisand, and Natalie Wood shopping there regularly. The shop closed in 1976.

After Elvis's death in 1977, his father Vernon was one of the executors of his estate, which was held in trust for his daughter Lisa Marie.  Vernon named Priscilla to be his successor upon his death. She assumed the role following Vernon's 1979 death. Graceland itself cost $500,000 a year in upkeep, and expenses had dwindled Lisa Marie's inheritance to only $1 million. Taxes due on the property and other expenses due came to over $500,000. Faced with having to sell Graceland, Priscilla examined other public homes and museums. She hired a CEO, Jack Soden, to turn Graceland into a tourist attraction. Graceland was opened to the public on June 7, 1982. Presley's gamble paid off; only four weeks after opening Graceland's doors, the estate made back all the money it had invested. Priscilla became the chairwoman and president of Elvis Presley Enterprises (EPE), stating that she would remain in the position until Lisa Marie reached 21 years of age. Under Presley's guidance, the enterprise's fortunes soared and eventually the trust grew to be worth over $100 million.

In 1988, Presley launched her own fragrance, Moments, and followed this up with a range of best-selling perfumes in the 1990s – Experiences in 1993, Indian Summer in 1996, and Roses and More in 1998. She has also successfully sold her line of products live on the Home Shopping Network and was coached by veteran HSN host Bob Circosta.

In 2006, Presley flew to Sydney, Australia for the debut of her worldwide line of bed linens, called the Priscilla Presley Collection. She partnered with Australian designer Bruno Schiavi for the line.

She has helped produce a couple of films, including Breakfast with Einstein and Finding Graceland. In September 2000, Presley was elected to the board of directors at Metro-Goldwyn-Mayer. Always supportive, in 2015 Priscilla became the executive producer of a 14-track album titled If I Can Dream: Elvis Presley With the Royal Philharmonic Orchestra. She states "If Elvis were here, he would be evolving and taking risks, seemingly like everybody else today." Also in that year the U.S. Postmaster General, Megan Brennan, and Priscilla Presley dedicated an Elvis "forever" stamp which featured a 1955 black and white shot by photographer William Speer. It was her second dedication of a USPS stamp. The first Elvis stamp, issued in 1993, was the most popular edition of stamps in the Postal Service history. Elvis became the first musical artist to be featured in two different collections of stamps.

On August 16, 2019, it was announced that she, in conjunction with John Eddie, as well as Sony Pictures, would create and produce Agent Elvis, a Netflix adult animated fictional series focusing on her former husband's nightly incursions as a spy for the US Government while he remained a musician during the day. The series' first teaser was published on the official Elvis Instagram account on June 15, 2022. The image showed an illustrated Elvis donning a black trench coat.

Acting career
Hal B. Wallis, a Hollywood producer who had financed many of Elvis' earlier films, had shown an interest in signing Priscilla to a contract. Elvis, however, had no intentions of allowing his wife to have a career of any kind; in his opinion, not uncommon at the time, was that "a woman's place was in the home looking after her man". Priscilla had shown an interest in dancing and modeling, but her knowledge of Elvis' stance meant that she kept them as hobbies instead of pursuing them as careers. She did get the opportunity to model for a local store once, but, when Elvis heard about it, he asked her to give it up.

Presley had originally been offered a role as one of the angels on Charlie's Angels. She turned down the role because she disliked the show. Priscilla made her television debut as co-host of Those Amazing Animals in 1980. In 1983, she got her first chance to act professionally on a season 2 episode of The Fall Guy titled "Manhunter". She then found a role in a television film titled Love is Forever, starring alongside Michael Landon. Although she was treated well by most of the cast and crew, and her acting was praised by several of her co-stars, she found Landon difficult to work with on set. After the television film aired, Presley landed the role of Jenna Wade in the soap opera Dallas. She was actually the third actress to play the role of Jenna, but played it for the longest. Presley left the show in 1988 after five years. During her tenure on the series, she was offered the role of Bond girl Stacey Sutton in A View to a Kill (1985), which she turned down due to scheduling conflicts.

In 1988, Presley starred opposite Leslie Nielsen in The Naked Gun: From the Files of Police Squad! as Jane Spencer. Critic Roger Ebert praised Presley's performance, saying her "light comic touch" helped balance out the film's more over-the-top humor. She would go on to act in the next two movies in the series: The Naked Gun 2½: The Smell of Fear (1991) and Naked Gun 33⅓: The Final Insult (1994). All three films performed solidly at the box office. In between, she appeared in The Adventures of Ford Fairlane (1990) with Andrew Dice Clay. During the mid-to-late-1990s she made guest appearances on the hit television shows Melrose Place, Touched by an Angel, and Spin City.

Presley made her pantomime debut in Snow White and the Seven Dwarfs at the New Wimbledon Theatre, Wimbledon, London, during Christmas of 2012, starring opposite Warwick Davis. She reprised her role of the Wicked Queen at the Manchester Opera House in 2014.

Charity work and activism

Since 2003, Presley has been the Ambassador of the Dream Foundation, a Santa Barbara-based wish-granting organization for terminally ill adults and their families.

Presley helped inaugurate the Narconon Stonehawk Rehabilitation Center in Albion, Michigan. Narconon is based on principles developed by science fiction writer L. Ron Hubbard, the founder of Scientology, and is "capable of eliminating the very cravings that drive addicts in recovery back to drugs," Presley said in a statement. Reports in the media in October 2017 that Presley had left the church were immediately denied by her. It was later further reported she distanced herself from the church, at the same time as Lisa, but did not leave the religion.

In 2013, Presley spoke out against the Tennessee Ag-Gag Bill in a letter to Tennessee Governor Bill Haslam. Presley cited her and Elvis' love of horses and expressed her concern that the bill would hinder animal cruelty investigations and reduce protections for horses and other farm animals.

Personal life 
Though she has never remarried, Presley has had romantic relationships since her divorce from Elvis. Immediately afterwards, she lived with karate instructor Mike Stone, an alliance that dissolved by 1975. She then dated photographer Terry O'Neill, lawyer Robert Kardashian, hairdresser Elie Ezerzer and financier Kirk Kerkorian.

Beginning in 1978, Presley had a six-year intermittent live-in relationship with model Michael Edwards, until he began developing feelings for the teenage Lisa Marie. Lisa Marie was aged 10 to 16 during his relationship with her mother. Edwards recounts the tale of their relationship in his book Priscilla, Elvis, and Me (1988), which discloses her liaisons with Julio Iglesias and Richard Gere in the early 1980s.

Presley's longest relationship has been with Brazilian screenwriter-turned-computer-programmer Marco Antonio Garcia (a.k.a. Marco Garibaldi), with whom she lived for 22 years. The two were introduced by costumer Kathy Monderine in 1984 after he wrote a script that she read, hoping to produce. Their son, musician Navarone Garibaldi, was born on March 1, 1987. Presley was starring in the primetime soap opera Dallas at the time and her pregnancy was written into the storyline. In 2006, they ended their relationship. At the beginning of their romance, Presley ensured Garibaldi sign a promissory agreement that if they should break up, he would not write a book about her.

Between 2006 and 2009, Presley dated British TV executive Nigel Lythgoe. In the early 2010s she was linked to restaurateur Richie Palmer, ex-husband of Raquel Welch, as well as Australian entertainer Barry Crocker and disc jockey Toby Anstis.

In 2017 it was suspected by various news outlets that Presley was in a relationship with a longtime friend, Welsh singer Tom Jones, who had become a widower the year before. In 2021, Jones commented on these rumors, stating that they have known each other since the 1960s and that they merely have a close friendship.

Through her daughter Lisa Marie, Presley has four grandchildren including actress Riley Keough. Her grandson Benjamin Keough died by suicide at age 27 on July 12, 2020. Presley became a great-grandmother through Riley Keough in 2022.

Her daughter Lisa Marie died after suffering a heart attack on January 12, 2023 at age 54.

Honors
Presley was conferred the degree of Doctor of Humanities by Rhodes College in 1998. She was named godmother of the largest steamboat ever built, American Queen, christened April 27, 2012 at its home port in Memphis. The AutoZone Liberty Bowl chose her as its 2018 Distinguished Citizen Award winner. On July 22, 2022, Theatre Memphis honored her contributions to Memphis art and tourism with a gala, “Honoring Priscilla Presley: The Artist, The Woman,” featuring more than a dozen speakers and a live musical tribute.

Filmography

Portrayals

Since 1979, Presley has been portrayed in several screen and TV films focusing on various aspects of her life with Elvis Presley, her husband from 1967 to 1973, by many actresses, most notably  i) Season Hubley in Elvis, the 1979 TV movie; ii)   Susan Walters in "Elvis and Me," a 1988 TV miniseries;  iii) Kehli O'Byrnein in  Elvis and the Colonel, a 1993 TV movie;  iv) Alyson Court  in Elvis Meets Nixon, 1997; v) Antonia Barnath in Elvis, a 2006 TV miniseries; vi) Ashley Greene in the fictional 2016 movie The Shangri la Suite;  vii)  Olivia de Jonge in Elvis, 2022; and viii) Cailee Spaeny in "Priscilla", to be released in 2023

Bibliography
 Presley, Priscilla (1985). Elvis and Me. .
 Presley, Priscilla; Presley, Lisa Marie (2005). Elvis by the Presleys. .

References

Sources
 Clayton, Rose / Dick Heard (2003). Elvis: By Those Who Knew Him Best. Virgin Publishing Limited. .
 Clutton, Helen (2004). Everything Elvis. .
 Edwards, Michael (1988). Priscilla, Elvis and Me. .
 Finstad, Suzanne (1997). Child Bride: The Untold Story of Priscilla Beaulieu Presley.
 Goldman, Albert (1981). Elvis. .
 Guralnick, Peter (1999). Careless Love. The Unmaking of Elvis Presley. Back Bay Books. .
 Guralnick, Peter; Jorgensen, Ernst (1999). Elvis: Day by Day. .
 Presley, Priscilla (1985). Elvis and Me. .

External links

Official Website
 
 
 
Priscilla Presley with Barbara Walters 1985

 
1945 births
20th-century American actresses
20th-century American women writers
20th-century American writers
21st-century American women writers
21st-century American writers
20th-century American businesspeople
21st-century American businesspeople
20th-century American businesswomen
21st-century American businesswomen
Actresses from New York City
American adoptees
American autobiographers
American expatriates in Germany
American film actresses
American people of English descent
American people of Norwegian descent
American people of Scotch-Irish descent
American Scientologists
American soap opera actresses
American television actresses
Television personalities from New York City
American women television personalities
Living people
People from Brooklyn
Television producers from New York City
Women autobiographers
American women television producers
Elvis Presley
Presley family